Kirklington is a village and civil parish in the Newark and Sherwood district of Nottinghamshire, England. The population as of the 2011 census was 400. Kirklington lies on the A617 road between Newark (9½ miles to the east) and Mansfield (10 miles to the west).

Kirklington once had a railway station on the Mansfield-Southwell line; it was closed to passenger traffic in 1929 and goods trains in 1964. The former trackbed is now the Southwell Trail footpath.

The place-name Kirklington seems to contain an Old English personal name, Cyrtla,   + tun (Old English), an enclosure; a farmstead; a village; an estate.., so  'Cyrtla's farm or settlement'. It might instead stem from Kirk-, an element found in a number of place names in the United Kingdom, deriving from kirk (Scottish), a general assembly; a church. This may refer to St. Swithun's Church, the parish church located in Kirklington.

Notable people
John Boddam-Whetham (1843–1918), cricketer and naturalist

See also
St Swithun's Church, Kirklington

References

External links 

some details of the parish church
photograph of the railway station

Villages in Nottinghamshire
Newark and Sherwood